Kamalendumati Shah (died 1999) was an Indian politician, social worker and a member of Indian Parliament. Hailing from the Tehri Garhwal district of the present day Uttarakhand, she was known to have been active in parliamentary politics. The Government of India awarded her the third highest civilian honour of the Padma Bhushan, in 1958, for her contributions to society. She died on 15 July 1999 succumbing to brain cancer.

References 

Recipients of the Padma Bhushan in social work
Year of birth missing
1999 deaths
People from Tehri Garhwal district
Social workers
Uttarakhand politicians
Members of Parliament from Uttarakhand
Women in Uttarakhand politics
20th-century Indian women politicians
20th-century Indian politicians
20th-century Indian educational theorists
Social workers from Uttarakhand
India MPs 1952–1957
Women educators from Uttarakhand
Educators from Uttarakhand
20th-century women educators